BBQ is an informal spelling of barbecue.

BBQ can also refer to:

Places
Barbuda Codrington Airport (IATA airport code: BBQ) serving Codrington on Barbuda
Basin Bridge railway station (rail station code: BBQ) serving Chennai, India

People
BBQ, a one-man band project of Canadian musician Mark Sultan (b. 1973)
Dr. BBQ, the barbecue pitmaster, author, and television personality Ray Lampe

Arts, entertainment, and media

Music
BBQ, the studio recordings code for Beggars Banquet Records
"The BBQ", a song from the 2017 album Champion by Tina & Her Pony

Other arts, entertainment, and media
BBQ with Bobby Flay, a food travelogue U.S. TV series
The BBQ, a 2018 Australian comedy film written and directed by Stephen Amis
"BBQ" (Bluey), an episode of the first season of the animated TV series Bluey

Other uses
Bamali language (ISO 639 code: BBQ)

See also
Barbecue (disambiguation)
List of barbecue restaurants, many of which have "BBQ" in the name